Hide and Seek is a 1972 British children's drama film directed by David Eady starring Peter Newby, Gary Kemp, Robin Askwith, Liz Fraser, Terence Morgan and David Lodge. It was filmed on location in Deptford, south-east London. The film received a Royal premiere for the Children's Film Foundation's 21st anniversary, attended by the Duchess of Kent.

Plot
Keith, a.k.a. the Deptford Dodger, is a runaway from Borstal eager to join his dad, who has told him in a letter that he is leaving England. However, when Keith encounters two local children, he discovers that his father is actually planning a bank heist.

Cast
 Peter Newby as Keith Lawson
 Gary Kemp as Chris Barker
 Eileen Fletcher as Beverley Dickie
 Robin Askwith as Fake Police Constable 
 Roger Avon as First workman 
 Richard Coleman as Police sergeant 
 Frances Cuka as Mrs. Dickie 
 Roy Dotrice as Mr. Grimes 
 Liz Fraser as Audrey Lawson 
 Godfrey James as Police Constable Dickie 
 Alan Lake as Lorrimer 
 David Lodge as Baker 
 Alfred Marks as Butcher 
 Terence Morgan as Ted Lawson
 Johnny Shannon as Wykes
 Bernard Spear as Fruit Vendor
 Graham Stark as Milkman

Critical reception
The BFI described it as "amongst the best of the CFF's 1970 (sic) output."

References

External links

1972 films
1972 drama films
Films directed by David Eady
British drama films
Children's Film Foundation
1970s English-language films
1970s British films